Synallactida is a rankless clade of sea cucumbers, but is referred to as an order. Taxa within Synallactida were previously classified in an order called Aspidochirotida, which was determined to be polyphyletic in 2017.

List of families 
Synallactida includes over 130 species in three extant families and two extinct genera: 
 Deimatidae Théel, 1882 – 3 genera
 Stichopodidae Haeckel, 1896 – 9 genera
 Synallactidae Ludwig, 1894 – 12 genera
 Genus †Collbatothuria Smith & Gallemí, 1991
 Genus †Tribrachiodemas Reich, 2010

References